The Golden Age of Mexican cinema is a period in the history of the Cinema of Mexico between 1930 and 1969 when the Mexican film industry reached high levels of production, quality and economic success of its films, besides having gained recognition internationally.

It began with the film Allá en el Rancho Grande (1936), directed by Fernando de Fuentes. In 1939, during World War II, the film industry in the US and Europe declined, because the materials previously destined for film production now were for the new arms industry. Many countries began to focus on making films about war, leaving an opportunity for Mexico to produce commercial films for the Mexican and Latin American markets. This cultural environment favored the emergence of a new generation of directors and actors considered to date, icons in Mexico and in Hispanic countries and Spanish-speaking audiences.

Mexican cinema of the Golden Age is also credited with propelling Norteño music into Chilean popular culture.

Origins

In 1939 Europe and the United States participated in World War II, and the film industries of these regions were severely affected. Europe due to its location and the United States because the materials used to produce films (such as cellulose), became scarce and were rationed. In 1942, when German submarines destroyed a Mexican tanker, Mexico joined the Allies in the war against Germany. Mexico won the status of most favored nation. Thus, the Mexican film industry found new sources of materials and equipment and secured its position in the production of quality films worldwide. During World War II, the film industry in France, Italy, Spain, Argentina and the United States focused on war films, which made it possible for the Mexican film industry, with much more versatile themes in its films, to become dominant in the markets of Mexico and Latin America.

Since the beginning of talkies in Mexico, some films like Santa (1932), directed by Antonio Moreno and The Woman of the Port (1934), directed by Arcady Boytler, were a huge blockbuster that showed that Mexico had the equipment and talent needed to sustain a strong film industry.

One of the first blockbusters was the film Allá en el Rancho Grande by Fernando de Fuentes, which became the first classic of Mexican cinema; this film is referred to as the initiator of the "Mexican film industry". In the early 1940s began the emergence of great Mexican film studios settled in Mexico City, they begin to support the mass production of films. Among the most important are CLASA Films, FILMEX, Films Mundiales, Cinematográfica Calderón, Películas Rodriguez and Producciones Mier y Brooks, among others.

Mexican cinema continued to produce works of superb quality and began to explore other genres such as comedy, romance and musical. In 1943, the film Wild Flower, brought together a team comprising the filmmaker Emilio Fernández, the photographer Gabriel Figueroa, the actor Pedro Armendariz and actress Dolores del Río. The films María Candelaria (1943) and The Pearl (1947), were considered pivotal works by Fernández and his team, and gave Mexican cinema enormous prestige, with their works being shown worldwide in major film festivals. María Candelaria was awarded in 1946 with the Golden Palm in the Cannes Film Festival. The Pearl was awarded the Golden Globe of the American film industry, being the first Spanish film to receive such recognition.

Cinematographic genres

Comedy

Many other comedians achieved consecration in Mexican cinema. From comic slapstick couples  (in the style of Laurel and Hardy) to independent actors who achieved a huge poster. Many of these comedians emerged from the called Carpas or Mexican popular theaters.
Joaquín Pardavé, was a popular actor who captivated with the same dramatic or comic characters. Pardavé was also a composer and film director, and his beginnings in the industry, from the Silent films, made him a "symbolic father" of all Mexican comedians from the thirties to the sixties.

Antonio Espino y Mora, better known as Clavillazo was another Mexican actor who began his career in the Carpas. More than 30 films are in his repertoire and is one of the most beloved and remembered artists. Another artist who started in the Carpas and also his sympathy, noted for his picturesque way of dancing was Adalberto Martínez "Resortes", who had a long career, then worked for over 70 years in film and television.

Gaspar Henaine and Marco Antonio Campos better known as "Viruta and Capulina" were a comic duo that were found in the form of white humor win the affection of the people. Viruta and Capulina began their career together in 1952, although individually had worked on other projects. They filmed more than 25 films.

Although they do not have a large number of films together, Manuel Palacios "Manolín"  and Estanislao Shilinsky Bachanska are remembered for their great chemistry in the theaters and later in the films.

Musical and Rumberas films

The Musical film genre in Mexico was strongly influenced by the Mexican folk music or Ranchero music. Stars as Pedro Infante, Jorge Negrete, Luis Aguilar and Antonio Aguilar made dozens of musical films of these genre who served as a platform to promote Mexican music. The songs of important composers like Agustín Lara or José Alfredo Jiménez served as the basis for the arguments of many films. Libertad Lamarque also highlighted by her performances where music and songs were the main protagonists.

The tropical music that was popular in Mexico and Latin America since the 1930s, and was also reflected in Mexican cinema. Numerous music magazines were made in the 1940s and 1950s. In these productions it was common to see figures ranging from Damaso Perez Prado, Toña la Negra, Rita Montaner, María Victoria or Los Panchos. However, the musical film in Mexico was mostly represented by the so-called Rumberas film, a unique cinematic curiosity of Mexico, dedicated to the film exaltation of the figure of the "rumba" (dancers of  Afro-Antillean rhythms). The main figures of this genre were Cubans María Antonieta Pons, Amalia Aguilar, Ninón Sevilla and Rosa Carmina and Mexican Meche Barba. Between 1938 and 1965 more than one hundred Rumberas films were made.

Film Noir
In Mexico, the Film Noir genre popular in Hollywood in the 1930s and 1940s was represented by the actor and director Juan Orol. Inspired by the popular Gangster film and figures like Humphrey Bogart and Edward G. Robinson, Orol created a filmic universe and a particular style by mixing elements of classic Film Noir with Mexican folklore, urban environments, cabaret, and tropical music. Examples include the classic film Gangsters Versus Cowboys (1948).

Horror films
Although the 1960s are considered the Golden Age of Horror and science fiction in Mexican cinema, during the Golden Age they were found some remarkable works. Chano Urueta, a prolific director who began in the silent era, had had their approaches with the supernatural in The Sign of Death (1939), however his greatest contributions come with The Amazing Beast (1952), film that first introduced the wrestlers in the genre. Other works in the genre would La Bruja (1954), and Ladrón de Cadáveres (1956).

Decline

On April 15, 1957, the whole country mourned with the news of the death of Pedro Infante. His death was one of the markers of the end of the Golden Age of Mexican cinema.

The first Mexican television transmissions started in 1950. By 1956, TV antennas were common in Mexican homes, and new media grew rapidly in the country outside the capital city. Despite the first black and white television pictures not having the clarity and sharpness of movie films, filmmakers immediately felt sharp competition from this new media, not only in Mexico but throughout the world. The competition forced the film industry to seek new ways to showcase its art, and in the treatment of subjects and genres.

Technical innovations came from Hollywood. Wide screens, three-dimensional cinema, color improvement and stereo sound were some of the innovations introduced by American cinema during the early 1950s. At the time, the high cost of these technologies made it difficult for Mexico to compete; therefore, not for some years was it able to produce films incorporating these innovations.

One of the nations where Mexican cinema was most popular was Yugoslavia, where for much of the 1950s, Mexican films comprised the majority of the films that were screened. The 1950 film Un día de vida, which premiered in 1952 in Yugoslavia, was one of the most popular films of the decade in that nation. The popularity of Mexican films led to the so-called Yu-Mex craze, as Mexican music and fashions were much imitated in Yugoslavia in the 1950s.

The world was changing and so was the way film was produced by other countries. The elimination of censorship in the United States allowed a more bold and realistic treatment of many topics. In France, a young generation of filmmakers educated in film criticism began the New Wave movement. In Italy, the Neorealism had claimed the careers of several filmmakers. The Swedish film with Ingmar Bergman made its appearance, while in Japan Akira Kurosawa appeared.

Meanwhile, Mexican cinema had been stalled by bureaucracy and difficulties with the union. Film production was now concentrated in a few hands, and the ability to see new filmmakers emerge was very difficult due to the demands on the directors on the part of the Union of Workers of Cinematographic Production (STPC). Three of the most important film studios disappeared between 1957 and 1958: Tepeyac, Clasa Films and Azteca.

Also in 1958, the Mexican Academy of Motion Picture Arts and Sciences decided to discontinue the Ceremony of the Ariel Award recognizing the best productions of the national cinema. The Ariel was instituted in 1946 and emphasized the thriving state of the industry.

Studios
 Estudios Churubusco

References

Further reading
 GARCÍA RIERA, Emilio (1986) Época de oro del cine mexicano Secretaría de Educación Pública (SEP) 
 GARCÍA RIERA, Emilio (1992–97) Historia documental del cine mexicano Universidad de Guadalajara, Consejo Nacional para la Cultura y las Artes (CONACULTA), Secretaría de Cultura del Gobierno del Estado de Jalisco y el Instituto Mexicano de Cinematografía (IMCINE) 
 GARCÍA, Gustavo y AVIÑA, Rafael (1993) Época de oro del cine mexicano ed. Clío 
 PARANAGUÁ, Paulo Antonio (1995) Mexican Cinema British Film Institute (BFI) Publishing en asociación con el Instituto Mexicano de Cinematografía (IMCINE) y el Consejo Nacional para la Cultura y las Artes (CONACULTA)  
 HERSHFIELD, Joanne (1996) Mexican Cinema, Mexican Woman (1940–1950) University of Arizona Press  
 
 AYALA BLANCO, Jorge (1997) La aventura del cine mexicano: En la época de oro y después ed. Grijalba 
 MACIEL, David R. Mexico's Cinema: A Century of Film and Filmmakers,  Wilmington, Delaware: SR Books, 1999. 
 MCKEE IRWIN, Robert  "Mexican Golden Age Cinema in Tito's Yugoslavia" pages 151-160 from The Global South, Volume 4, Issue 1, Spring 2010. 
 
 MORA, Carl J. Mexican Cinema: Reflections of a Society, 1896–2004, Berkeley: University of California Press, 3rd edition 2005. 
 NOBLE, Andrea, Mexican National Cinema, Taylor & Francis, 2005, 
 
 Paxman, Andrew. "Who Killed the Mexican Film Industry? The Decline of the Golden Age, 1946-1960." Estudios Interdisciplinarios de América Latina y el Caribe 29, no. 1 (2018): 9-33.

External links

 More of 100 Years of Mexican Cinema en el sitio del ITESM.
 Cineteca Nacional del Consejo Nacional para la Cultura y las Artes de México (Conaculta)

 
Cinema of Mexico
Mexican cinema